LG Optimus L5 II is a middle range slate-format smartphone designed and manufactured by LG Electronics. The Optimus L5 II phone runs Android 4.1 Jelly Bean.

Hardware
The Optimus L5 runs on a 1 GHz MediaTek MT6575 CPU, and has 512MB of RAM. There also exists a dual-SIM variant called LG Optimus L5 II Dual (E455).

See also
 LG Optimus
 List of LG mobile phones
 Comparison of smartphones

References

Android (operating system) devices
LG Electronics smartphones
Discontinued smartphones